The 1953 Dartmouth Indians football team was an American football team that represented Dartmouth College as an independent during the 1953 college football season. In their 11th season under head coach Tuss McLaughry, the Indians compiled a 2–7 record, and were outscored 219 to 152. Bayard Johnson was the team captain.

Dartmouth played its home games at Memorial Field on the college campus in Hanover, New Hampshire.

Schedule

References

Dartmouth
Dartmouth Big Green football seasons
Dartmouth Indians football